Truth or Consequences Municipal Schools is a school district headquartered in Truth or Consequences, New Mexico, U.S.

Its boundary is all of Sierra County.

History

In 2020 Channell Segura became the superintendent.

By 2021 Segura made changes in curriculum building and allowed outside candidates to fill every principal position.

In July 2022 Segura announced she would leave her position effective August 5, 2022.

Schools
Schools are in Truth or Consequences unless otherwise stated.

 Secondary
 Hot Springs High School
 Truth or Consequences Middle School

 Elementary
 Arrey Elementary School (Arrey)
 Sierra Elementary Complex
 Truth or Consequences Elementary School

References

External links
 

School districts in New Mexico
Sierra County, New Mexico